Miłosna may refer to the following places in Poland:
Miłosna, Lower Silesian Voivodeship (south-west Poland)
Miłosna, Łódź Voivodeship (central Poland)
Miłosna, Warmian-Masurian Voivodeship (north Poland)